Acentropinae is a fairly small subfamily of the lepidopteran family Crambidae, the crambid snout moths. Species of this subfamily are exclusively found in wetlands and aquatic habitats.

Systematics

In modern treatments, the former subfamily Nymphulinae is mostly treated as a tribe within Acentropinae. There are about 730 species in 78 genera. Only 13 species in 6 genera are found in Europe.

Acentria Stephens, 1829 (= Acentropus J. Curtis, 1834; Setina Hübner, 1819; Zancle Stephens, 1833)
Agassiziella Yoshiyasu, 1989 (= Agassizia Yoshiyasu, 1987)
Almonia Walker, 1866
Anydraula Meyrick, 1885
Araeomorpha Turner, 1908 (= Tholerastis Turner, 1915)
Argyractis Hampson, 1897
Argyractoides Lange, 1956
Argyrophorodes Marion, 1956
Aulacodes Guenée, 1854 (= Hydrophysa Guenée, 1854)
Banepa Moore, 1888
Brevicella Kenrick, 1912
Callilitha Munroe, 1959
Cataclysta Hübner, 1825 (= Catoclysta Hampson, 1893)
Chrysendeton Grote, 1881
Clepsicosma Meyrick, 1888
Compsophila Meyrick, 1886
Contiger Lange, 1956
Cryptocosma Lederer, 1863 (= Chalcoelopsis Dyar, 1914)
Decticogaster Snellen, 1880
Diathraustodes Hampson, 1896
Dodanga Moore, 1886
Elophila Hübner, 1822 (= Cyrtogramme Yoshiyasu, 1985; Elophila Hübner, 1806; Hydrocampus Berthold, 1827; Hydrocampa Stephens, 1829; Hydrocampe Latreille, 1829; Munroessa Lange, 1956; Synclita Lederer, 1863)
Eoophyla Swinhoe, 1900
Eoparargyractis Lange, 1956 (= Eoparargyractis Lange, 1956)
Ephormotris Meyrick, 1933
Eristena Warren, 1896
Eurytorna Meyrick, 1886
Galadra Walker, 1865
Giorgia J. F. G. Clarke, 1965
Glyphandra Karsch, 1900
Goniopalpia Hampson, 1903
Hemiloba Swinhoe, 1901
Hyaloplaga Warren, 1892 (= Hyaloplagia Sharp, 1893)
Hygraula Meyrick, 1885 (= Blechroglossa Turner, 1937; Blechroglosso Neave, 1950)
Hylebatis Turner, 1908
Kasania Krulikovsky, 1910
Langessa Munroe, 1972
Lasiogyia Hampson, 1907
Lathroteles J. F. G. Clarke, 1971
Leucogephyra Warren, 1896
Margarochroma Warren, 1896
Margarosticha Lederer, 1863
Neargyractis Lange, 1956
Neocataclysta Lange, 1956
Neoschoenobia Hampson, 1900 (= Eranistis Meyrick, 1910)
Neurophruda Warren, 1896 (= Neophruda Hampson, 1897)
Nicaria Snellen, 1880
Nyctiplanes Turner, 1937
Nymphicula Snellen, [1880]
Nymphula Schrank, 1802 (= Pseudoparaponyx Patocka, 1951)
Nymphuliella Lange, 1956
Nymphulodes Hampson, 1919
Oligernis Meyrick, 1894
Oligostigma Guenée, 1854
Oligostigmoides Lange, 1956
Opisthedeicta Warren, 1890
Osphrantis Meyrick, 1897
Oxyelophila Forbes, 1922
Paracataclysta Yoshiyasu, 1983
Paracymoriza Warren, 1890 (= Micromania Swinhoe, 1894; Stenicula Snellen, 1901)
Parapoynx Hübner, 1825 (= Cosmophylla Turner, 1908; Eustales Clemens, 1860; Hydreuretis Meyrick, 1885; Microdracon Warren, 1890; Nymphaeella Grote, 1880; Paraponyx Guenée, 1854; Sironia Clemens, 1860)
Petrophila Guilding, 1830 (= Parargyractis Lange, 1956)
Potamomusa Yoshiyasu, 1985 (= Potamusa Speidel & Mey, 1999)
Pseudlithosia Hampson, 1907 (= Pseudolithosia Neave, 1940)
Pythagoraea Meyrick, 1929 (= Pythagorea Klima, 1937)
Stegothyris Lederer, 1863
Strepsinoma Meyrick, 1897
Symphonia Hampson, 1896
Synclitodes Munroe, 1974
Temnobasis Gaede, 1916
Teratausta Hampson, 1903
Teratauxta E. Hering, 1901 (= Ridleyana Hampson, 1906)
Tetrernia Meyrick, 1890 (= Metaclysta Hampson, 1906)
Theila Swinhoe, 1900 (= Ambahona Marion, 1954; Ambahonia Marion, 1954)
Thevitella Viette, 1958
Usingeriessa Lange, 1956

Former genera
Ambia Walker, 1859
Gethosyne Warren, 1896
Niphadaza Butler, 1886
Physematia Lederer, 1863

See also
 List of crambid genera

References

External links

 Lepiforum Acentropinae Images
 

 

Taxa named by James Francis Stephens